Massy Stores (formerly Hi-Lo Foods Stores) is a nationwide supermarket chain in Trinidad and Tobago. It is a subsidiary of the Massy Group (formerly Neal & Massy) of companies and part of the IGA network. Originally opened by Cannings Foods Limited, Hi-Lo was rebranded as Massy Stores in 2014 as part of an effort to make consumers familiar with other businesses operating under the Massy Group.

References

External links 
 Official Website

Supermarkets of Trinidad and Tobago